Rajiv Kumar (born 2 December 1976) is an Indian former first-class cricketer who played for Bihar and Jharkhand. He currently works as the head coach of Jharkhand and fielding coach for Chennai Super Kings

Rajiv also captained former Indian  captain Mahendra Singh Dhoni in first class career

Career
A right-handed batsman, Kumar appeared for Bihar between 1994/95 and 2003/04 seasons, as well as Jharkhand between 2004/05 and 2010/11. He also played in 1998 for India 'A against Australia, He was also part of the India A team touring Holland in 1999. He was the third highest run-getter of the 1997–98 Ranji Trophy with 805 runs at an average of 57.50 including three centuries. After Jharkhand replaced Bihar in domestic cricket in 2004/05, Kumar continued his career with the new team. He played for East Zone and Wills' XI as well and captained Jharkhand in a few matches. In late 2007, he joined the rebel Indian Cricket League (ICL) and played for Royal Bengal Tigers (Kolkata Tigers) until the next season. He returned to domestic cricket accepting BCCI's amnesty offer for ICL players. He played his last competitive match in December 2010.

Kumar became the Jharkhand under-19 coach in 2014. Ahead of the 2015/16 season, the Jharkhand State Cricket Association named Kumar as the head coach of Jharkhand senior team, replacing V. Venkatram at the position.

Coaching career
He was appointed as Fielding coach for Chennai Super Kings.

References

External links 
 

1976 births
Living people
Indian cricketers
Bihar cricketers
Jharkhand cricketers
East Zone cricketers
Indian cricket coaches
Cricketers from Patna
Royal Bengal Tigers cricketers